The national anthem of Austria, also known by its incipit "", was adopted in 1946. The melody, originally attributed to Wolfgang Amadeus Mozart but now disputed among various composers (most probably by ), was matched with a text by Paula von Preradović the following year.

History
Nineteen days before his death on 5 December 1791, Wolfgang Amadeus Mozart composed his last complete work, the Freimaurerkantate, K. 623. In parts of the printed edition of this cantata there appeared the song K. 623a "" ("Let us with joined hands"). To this melody the Austrian national anthem is sung.

Before the World War II Anschluss, Austria's state anthem was "Sei gesegnet ohne Ende", set to the tune of Haydn's "Gott erhalte Franz den Kaiser", the state anthem of imperial Austria since 1797. The current German national anthem "Deutschlandlied" uses the same tune, but with different words (it was also the co-national anthem of Germany during National Socialist rule). To avoid the association, and because singing it was banned for a time after the war, a new state anthem was created. The lyrics were written by Paula von Preradović, one of the few women to have written lyrics for a national anthem. On 22 October 1946, the song was officially declared Austria's national anthem, albeit without words. Lyrics were added in February 1947. On 1 January 2012, parts of the lyrics were changed to make the composition gender-neutral.

Attempts at gender-neutral language
Since the 1990s, several attempts have been made to modify the lyrics to use more gender-neutral language. In 2005, Women's Minister Maria Rauch-Kallat of the Austrian People's Party (ÖVP) stated her objection to the words sons, fraternal and fatherland in the lyrics and proposed changes. Her proposal met strong resistance by Austria's largest newspaper, the Kronen Zeitung, and failed to gain support from the then coalition partner, the Alliance for the Future of Austria (BZÖ).

In January 2010 Austrian pop singer Christina Stürmer presented a pop version of the hymn "Heimat bist du großer Söhne und Töchter" ("Thou art home to great sons and daughters") as part of a campaign by the Austrian federal ministry of education. She was sued for violation of copyright by the estate of Paula von Preradović but subsequently cleared by the Austrian Supreme Court of Justice who called it "a mere modernisation" and allowed the version to stand.

Since 1 January 2012 a few words in the state anthem are different from before. The text and notes of the state anthem were officially codified in the "Bundesgesetz über die Bundeshymne der Republik Österreich".

Lyrics

The anthem is currently sung to the following melody:

Parody

Land of the peas, land of the beans,
Land of the four zones of occupation,
we sell thee on the black market!
And up there over the Hermannskogel
gladly the federal bird flutters.
Much beloved Austria!

According to media researcher , the first two of these lines were popular in the schools of Vienna in 1955.

References

Notes

External links

 Bundeshymne at Chancellery, Austrian Federal Government
 "Land der Berge, Land am Strome" – audio, lyrics and information (archive link)
 Vocal version
 Instrumental version

Austrian songs
Austria
National symbols of Austria
Austria
Austria
Austria
Songs about Austria
Mozart: spurious and doubtful works